Jerry Bookout (November 2, 1933 – February 22, 2006) was an American politician and funeral director.

Born in Rector, Arkansas, Bookout went to the Rector public schools. In 1955, Bookout graduated with a bachelor's degree in history and political science, from Arkansas State University. From 1955 to 1957, Bookout served in the United States Army and then Arkansas National Guard. Bookout served as a funeral director in Jonesboro, Arkansas. From 1966 to 1972, Bookout served in the Arkansas House of Representatives from the 11th District and was a Democrat. Then, from 1973 to 1995 and from 2003 until his death, Bookout served in the Arkansas State Senate. Bookout died from cancer in Jonesboro, Arkansas. His son Paul Bookout also served in the Arkansas General Assembly.

Notes

External links

1933 births
2006 deaths
Politicians from Jonesboro, Arkansas
People from Rector, Arkansas
Arkansas State University alumni
American funeral directors
Businesspeople from Arkansas
Democratic Party members of the Arkansas House of Representatives
Democratic Party Arkansas state senators
Deaths from cancer in Arkansas
20th-century American politicians
20th-century American businesspeople